Ts'oogot Gaay Lake is one of Canada's most westerly lakes, located in the south west corner of Yukon at the Beaver Creek border with Alaska,  NW along the Alaska Highway from Beaver Creek's townsite.

This lake complex also includes Ch'į̀hjiit Lake, Dlaałäl Lake, and Mänh Ts'eek.

The vegetation around Ts'oogot Gaay Lake is mainly sparse and often low-growth subarctic forest.

References 

Lakes of Yukon